Los Mejores Anos de Nuestra Vida: Greatest Hits is the first compilation of Spanish singer Marta Sanchez. Was released in United States on June 5, 2001. The first CD includes the singles on the original version and the second CD it's a remix collection mostly from her previous album "Desconocida". It sold 500,000 copies worldwide.

Track listing 
CD 1  
 Quiero Más de Ti – 3:26
 Desesperada – 3:46
 Arena y Sol – 3:15	
 De Mujer a Mujer – 4:52
 Desconocida – 4:38
 Negro Azabache (If I Ever Loose This Heaven) – 5:13
 Los Mejores Años de Nuestra Vida (I Migliori Anni Della Nostra Vita) – 4:25
 Vivo Por Ella (Vivo Per Lei) (Duet with Andrea Bocelli) – 4:26
 La Belleza – 3:30	
 Moja Mi Corazón – 4:55	
 Lejos de Aquella Noche – 3:31	
 Dime la Verdad – 4:10
 Amen – 3:50
 Tal Vez – 3:47
 Enamorada Sin Querer – 3:57
 Y Sin Embargo Te Quiero – 4:32

CD 2 
 Desconocida [Bombay Mix] – 4:52
 Desconocida [Fun Mix Radio Edit by Jean] – 3:44
 Desconocida [Fun Mix Extended Mix by Jean] – 5:13
 Desconocida [Lazy Mix Radio Edit by Jean] – 3:39
 Desconocida [Latin Mix] – 3:54
 Perfect Stranger – 4:31
 Desperate Lovers [Extended] – 5:22
 Desesperada [Extended] – 5:18
 Where the Love Never Ends – 4:52
 Quiero Más de Ti [LB Classic Mix] – 5:50
 Quiero Más de Ti [Noryb Siul Big Ben Dub] – 4:27
 Quiero Más de Ti [Sweet Briz Extended] – 8:32
 Quiero Más de Ti [Sweet Briz Radio Edit] – 3:53

Marta Sánchez albums
2001 greatest hits albums
2001 remix albums
PolyGram remix albums